Ružići is a village in a municipality of Grude, Bosnia and Herzegovina.

Notable residents
Andrija Nikić
Ivan Alilović
Ljubo Jurčić

Demographics

According to the 2013 census, its population was 1,688.

References

Populated places in Grude